Alex Wesby (born July 5, 1980) is an American retired basketball player from Philadelphia. He played for Temple in college and played as a professional player in multiple countries in Europe.

Career
In the 2010–11 season, Wesby played in Sweden for Sundsvall Dragons. He won the Most Valuable Player award of the Swedish League, as well as the award for the Best Defender.

Wesby signed with GasTerra Flames from Groningen, Netherlands for the 2011–12 season. He reached the semifinals with Groningen and was named to the All-DBL Team.

He returned to the Sundsvall Dragons for his fourth stand with the club for the 2012–13 season. He signed till 2015. He started the 2013–14 season in Sweden, but left the club in December 2013 because of personal reasons.

In the 2014 offseason he signed with another Swedish team, LF Basket Norrbotten.

Honours

Club
Joensuun Kataja
Korisliiga finalist (2): 2005–06, 2013–14
Finnish cup runner-up (1): 2005–06
Steiner Swans Gmunden
Austrian Basketball Cup (1): 2003–04
Sundsvall Dragons
Ligan (2): 2008–09, 2010–11

Individual
Basketligan MVP (1): 2010–11
Ligan Best Defender (1): 2010–11
 Ligan All-Star (2): 2008, 2011
All-DBL Team (1): 2011–12

References

External links
Alex Wesby – baskethotel.com
R.H. Consultancy profile 
Eurobasket.com profile
Draft Express profile

1980 births
Living people
American expatriate basketball people in Austria
American expatriate basketball people in Finland
American expatriate basketball people in the Netherlands
American expatriate basketball people in Sweden
American men's basketball players
Basketball players from Philadelphia
Donar (basketball club) players
Dutch Basketball League players
Kataja BC players
Shooting guards
Sundsvall Dragons players
Swans Gmunden players
Temple Owls men's basketball players
Torpan Pojat players